Nothobachia is a genus of lizards. It is monotypic with Nothobachia ablephara as the sole species. It is endemic to Bahia state of eastern Brazil.

References

Gymnophthalmidae
Reptiles of Brazil
Endemic fauna of Brazil
Monotypic lizard genera
Taxa named by Miguel Trefaut Rodrigues